This is a list of ships of the line (ironclads, coastal defence ships or battleships) serving either in the Royal Danish Navy or the Royal Dano-Norwegian Navy.

Sail battleships (ships of the line)
Hercules 81 guns - Captured by Sweden 1563, returned 1570
Hector 38 guns - Captured by Sweden 1563 and renamed Danska Hektor, scuttled c. 1566
Hjort 46 guns - Captured by Sweden 1563, returned 1570
Byens Loffue 56 guns - Captured by Sweden 1564 and renamed Böse Lejon, returned 1570
Morian 47 guns - Captured by Sweden 1564 and renamed Danska Morian, returned 1570
David 42 guns - Captured by Sweden 1564, returned 1570
Skotske Pink 56 guns - Captured by Sweden 1564 and renamed Skotska Pincka, recaptured 1569
Jegermesther 90 guns - Captured by Sweden 1565, returned 1570
Merkurius - Storm 1566
Samson - Storm 1566
Hannibal - Storm 1566
Fortuna 80 guns
Prindse-Bark 64 guns
Samson 62 guns
Josaphat 52 guns
Josua 48 guns
Drage 42 guns
Trefoldighed 48 guns
Tre Løver 46 guns - Captured by Sweden 1644 and renamed Tre Lejon
Spes 38-66 (c. 1612) - BU 1673
Patienta 48 (c. 1616) - Captured by Sweden 1644
St Sophia 40 (c. 1624) - Wrecked in storm 1645
Oldenborg 32-42 (c. 1628) - Captured by Sweden 1644
Hannibal 44 guns
Viktoria 48 guns
Frederik 86 guns
Sofia Amalia 86 guns
Prinds Kristian
Norske Løve 44 guns
Tre Kroner 42 guns
Sorte Rytter 40 guns
Trefoldighed 66 guns
Lindorm 46 guns
København 32 guns - Rearmed to 50 guns, scuttled 1676
Tre Løver 60 guns
Nelleblad 46 guns
Norske Løve 86 guns - Wrecked 1666
Tre Kroner 74 guns
Oldenborg 47 guns?/48 guns
Slesvig 52 guns - Renamed Kurprinds
Prins Jørgen 52 guns
Delmenhorst 46 guns - Scuttled as part of Provesteen battery, 1713
Gyldenløve 36 guns - Rearmed to 56 guns, captured by Britain but released, 1694
Prinds Georg 80 guns - Scuttled as part of Trekroner battery, 1713
Charlotta Amalia 54 guns - Scuttled as part of Trekroner battery, 1713
Christianus V 86 guns
Anna Sofia 60 guns
Churprinds 76 guns
Nelleblad? 56 guns
Christiania 54 guns
Fredericus III 60 guns
Enighed 62 guns - Scuttled 1679
Neptunus 42 guns
Norske Løve 84 guns - Sank 1679
Flyvende Hjort 44 guns
Elephanten 84 guns
Prinds Frederik 84 guns
Tre Kroner 84 (c. 1664) - Scuttled as part of Trekroner battery, 1713
Christianus IV 50-64 (c. 1672) - Scuttled as part of Provesteen battery, 1719
Tomler 52 (c. 1682) - Scuttled as part of Provesteen battery, 1723
Sværdfisk 52 (c. 1682) - Scuttled as part of Provesteen battery, 1723
Slesvig 50/52 (c. 1684) - Storm 1711
Dannebroge 94 (c. 1692) - Blew up 1710
Tre Løver 78 guns
Prinds Christian 76 guns
Sophia Hedevig 76 guns
Dronning Louisa 70 guns
Prinds Carl 54 guns
Prinds Wilhelm 54 guns
Oldenborg 52 guns
Fredericus IV 110 guns
Justitia 90 guns (1707)
Haffru 70 guns
Beskjermer 64 guns
Ebenetzer 64 guns
Ditmarsken 50 guns
Laaland 50 guns
Dronning Anna Sophia 90 guns
Tre Løver 60 (c. 1730)
Prinsesse Charlotte Amalia 60 (c. 1731)
Prinsesse Louise 60 (c. 1731) - Discarded 1771?
Markgrevinde Sophia Christina 60 (c. 1732) - Discarded 1753?/56?
Christianus VI 90 (c. 1733) - Discarded 1769?
(Nye) Delmenhorst 50 (c. 1735) - Discarded 1777?
Jylland 70 (c. 1739) - Discarded 1761? (not to be confused with the frigate "Jylland", c. 1801, present day museum)
Wenden 70/72 (c. 1742)
Kjøbenhavn 70 (c. 1744)
Fyen 50/52 (c. 1746)
Island 50/60 (c. 1751)
Stormar 60 (c. 1751)
Dronning Juliane Marie 70 (c. 1752) - Discarded 1788?
Fredericus V 90 (c. 1753) - Discarded 1775?
Sejer 60 (c. 1754)
Grønland 50 (c. 1756)
Kronprintz 70 (c. 1756)
Dannemark 70 (c. 1757)
Ebenetzer 50 (c. 1758)
St Croix 50 (c. 1758)
Mars 50 (c. 1760)
Jylland 70 (1762)
Norske Løve 70 (c. 1765)
Slesvig 50 (c. 1767)
Christian VII 90 (1767)
Øresund 60 (1768)
Prindsesse Vilhelmine Caroline 60 (1769)
Elefanten 70 (1774)- discarded 1802
Holsteen 60 (c. 1775)- captured by Royal Navy, Battle of Copenhagen 1801. Recommissioned as HMS Holstein 1802, renamed HMS Nassau 1805.
Dannebroge 60 (1773)- sunk, Battle of Copenhagen 1801
Wagrien 64 (1774)- sunk, Battle of Copenhagen 1801
Prindsesse Sophia Frederica 74 (1779) - captured by the British 1807
Justitia 74 (1780) - captured by the British 1807
Oldenburg 60-64 (c. 1779) - Discarded 1799?
Ditmarsken 64 (c. 1780) - Captured and destroyed by the British, 1807
Arveprinds Frederich 74 (1788) - captured by the British, 1807
Princess Louisa Augusta 64 (c. 1783) - Discarded 1829?
Kronprins Frederich 74 (1786) - captured by the British, 1807
Mars 64 (c. 1789) - captured and destroyed by the British, 1807
Nordstiernen 74 (c. 1788) - discarded 1805
Indfødsretten 64 (1787) - sunk, Battle of Copenhagen, 1801
Fyen 74 (1787) - captured by the British, 1807
Sjælland 74 (1791) - sunk, Battle of Copenhagen, 1801
Odin 74 (1791) - captured by the British, 1807
Neptunus 80 (1791) - Captured by Britain, aground and burnt 1807
Tre Kroner 74 (1789) - Captured by Britain 1807
Kronprindsesse Maria 70-74 (1791) - Captured by Britain 1807
Skjold 70 (1796) - Captured by Britain 1807
Dannemark 74 (1799) - Captured by Britain 1807
Sejeren 64 (1800) - Captured by Britain 1807
Waldemar 84 (1800) - Captured by Britain 1807
Norge 72 (1801) - Captured by Britain 1807
Christian VII 90 (1805) - Captured by Britain 1807
Prinds Christian Frederik 74 (1806) - destroyed and burned, Battle of Sjællands Odde 1808
Prindsesse Caroline 74 (1805) - Captured by Britain 1807
(3 battleships) 74 guns - Not launched; captured and destroyed by the British, 1807
Phoenix 60 (1811) - Discarded 1834
Danmark 66 (1818) - Discarded 1856
Dronning Marie 84 (1825) - Discarded 1862
Waldemar 94 (1830) - Discarded 1864
Frederik VI 94 (1832) - Discarded 1872
Skjold 94 guns (1836) - Discarded 1873
Christian VIII 84 (1841) - destroyed by coastal artillery, Eckernförde, 1849
Dannebrog 82 guns (1853) - Rebuilt 1863 as 16-gun armored frigate, discarded 1897

Steam battleships (ironclads)
Dannebrog (1863)
Rolf Krake (1863)
Peder Skram (1864)
Danmark (1864)
Lindormen (1868)
Gorm (1870)
Odin (1872)
Helgoland (1878)
Tordenskjold (torpedo ram) 1880

Coastal defence ships
Iver Hvitfeldt (1886)
Skjold (1896)
Herluf Trolle class
Herluf Trolle (1899)
Olfert Fischer (1903) 
Peder Skram (1908) BU, 1949
Niels Juel (1918) Sunk, 1945

See also
List of Danish sail frigates
List of Danish ships captured at Battle of Copenhagen